A beatboxer is a person who performs beatboxing vocal percussion.

Beatbox or beat box may also refer to:
 "Beat Box" (Art of Noise song)
 "Beatbox" (NCT Dream song)
 "Beat Box" (SpotemGottem song)
 "Beatbox", a song from the album Crossing the Rubicon by The Sounds
 B/E/A/T/B/O/X, a 2007 album by Glass Candy
 The Beatbox, an Irish music radio and TV show

See also
 Drum machine, an electric device that imitates the sounds of a drum kit
 Boombox, a portable cassette or CD player
 Stomp box, a particular percussion instrument operated by the foot